The 2013–14 season was the 103rd season in Hajduk Split’s history and their twenty-third in the Prva HNL. Their 4th place finish in the 2012–13 season means it is their 23rd successive season playing in the Prva HNL.

First-team squad

Competitions

Overall record

Prva HNL

Classification

Results summary

Results by round

Results by opponent

Source: 2013–14 Croatian First Football League article

Matches

Friendlies

Pre-season

On-season

Mid-season

Croatian Football Super Cup

Source: HRnogomet.com

Prva HNL

Source: HRnogomet.com

Croatian Football Cup

Source: HRnogomet.com

Europa League

Second qualifying round

Third qualifying round 

Source: uefa.com

Player seasonal records
Competitive matches only. Updated to games played 11 May 2014.

Top scorers

Source: Competitive matches

Disciplinary record
Includes all competitive matches. Players with 1 card or more included only.

Sources: Prva-HNL.hr, UEFA.com

Appearances and goals

Sources: Prva-HNL.hr, UEFA.com

Transfers

In

Out

Loans out

Sources: nogometni-magazin.com

Notes

References

2013-14
Croatian football clubs 2013–14 season
2013–14 UEFA Europa League participants seasons